The Chief Dental Officers (or CDOs) in the United Kingdom are the most senior advisors for dentistry in each of the four UK governments, and are the heads of the dental profession.  The CDO is one of the six chief professional officers, one for each of six professions, to give advice in their respective speciality.

List of Chief Dental Officers for England
Mr William G Senior, 1956–1961
Mr William Holgate, 1961–1971
Mr George D Gibb, 1972–1984
Professor Martin Downer, 1984–1990
Mr Brian Mouatt, 1990–1996
Mr Robin Wild, 1997–2000
Dame Margaret Seward DBE, 2000–2002
Professor Raman Bedi, 2002–2005
Mr Barry Cockcroft CBE, 2005–2015 (acting 2005 to 2006)
Ms Sara Hurley, 2015–

List of Chief Dental Officers for Scotland
Mr Thomas HJ Douglas, 1956–1959
Mr James W Galloway, 1959–1971
Dr James L Trainer, 1971–1979
Dr Martin C Downer, 1979–1983
Mr Norman K Colquhoun, 1984–1993
Mr J Robin Wild, 1993–1997
Mr T Ray Watkins CBE, 1997–2007
Miss M Margie Taylor CBE, 2007–2018
Mr Tom Ferris, 2018–

List of Chief Dental Officers for Wales
Mr William G Senior, 1956–1961
Mr William Holgate, 1961–1971
Mr George D Gibb, 1972–1984
Mr Dighton R Edwards, 1984–1985
Mr David M Heap, 1986–1996
Dr Paul Langmaid CBE, 1996–2010
Dr David Thomas, 2010–2016
Dr Colette Bridgman MBE, 2016–2021
Mr Andrew Dickenson, 2022-

List of Chief Dental Officers for Northern Ireland
Mr William G Senior, 1956–1961
Mr William Holgate, 1961–1971
Mr George D Gibb, 1972–1984
Mr James F Mageean, 1984–1990
Mr William J N Collins, 1990–1998
Ms Doreen Wilson, 1998–2006
Mr Donncha O'Carolan, 2006–2013
Mr Simon C Reid, 2013–2020
Mr Michael Donaldson, 2020–2021 (acting)
Ms Caroline Lappin, 2021–

References

 Open Wide – Memoir of the Dental Dame, Dame Margaret Seward, published by The Memoir Club, 

 
Administrators in the National Health Service
British dentists
Civil servants in the Ministry of Health (United Kingdom)